Melchiorre Grimaldi (died 1512) was a Roman Catholic prelate who served as Bishop of Brugnato (1510–1512).

Biography
On 24 May 1510, Melchiorre Grimaldi was appointed during the papacy of Pope Julius II as Bishop of Brugnato.
He served as Bishop of Brugnato until his death in 1512.

References

External links and additional sources
 (for Chronology of Bishops) 
 (for Chronology of Bishops) 

16th-century Italian Roman Catholic bishops
Bishops appointed by Pope Julius II
1512 deaths